Curtomerus brunneus is a species of beetle in the family Cerambycidae. It was described by Theodor Franz Wilhelm Kirsch in 1889.

References

Elaphidiini
Beetles described in 1889